Chris Sander is a Missouri politician, serving as a member of the Missouri House of Representatives from the 33rd district.

Missouri House of Representatives 

He is one of three openly LGBT Republicans in the Missouri House of Representatives.

Committee assignments 

 Downsizing State Government
 Financial Institutions
 Special Committee on Small Business

Electoral history

References 

Republican Party members of the Missouri House of Representatives
Living people
Year of birth missing (living people)
LGBT state legislators in Missouri
Gay politicians
21st-century LGBT people